Lakewood is a city in Los Angeles County, California, United States. The population was 80,048 at the 2010 census. It is bordered by Long Beach on the west and south, Bellflower on the north, Cerritos on the northeast, Cypress on the east, and Hawaiian Gardens on the southeast. Major thoroughfares include Lakewood (SR 19), Bellflower, and Del Amo Boulevards and Carson and South Streets. The San Gabriel River Freeway (I-605) runs through the city's eastern regions.

History
Lakewood is a post-World War II planned community. Developers Louis Boyar, Mark Taper and Ben Weingart are credited with "altering forever the map of Southern California." Begun in late 1949, the completion of the developers' plan in 1953 helped in the transformation of mass-produced housing from its early phases in the 1930s and 1940s to the reality of the postwar 1950s.

WWII veterans could get home loans with no down payment and a 30-year mortgage at only 4 percent interest. On the first day of sales, March 24, 1950, an estimated 30,000 people lined up to walk through a row of seven model houses. By the end of April, more than 200,000 people had flocked to the Lakewood Park sales office and more than 1,000 families had purchased homes (30 per day on average). On one occasion, 107 homes were sold in just one hour. The monthly cost was $44 to $56, including principal, interest and insurance.

The building of Lakewood broke records. Empty fields became 17,500 houses in less than three years. A new house was completed every  minutes, 40 to 60 houses per day, with a record 110 completed in a single day.

Lakewood's primary thoroughfares are mostly boulevards with landscaped medians, with frontage roads on either side in residential districts. Unlike in most similar configurations, however, access to the main road from the frontage road is only possible from infrequently spaced collector streets. This arrangement, hailed by urban planners of the day, is a compromise between the traditional urban grid and the arrangement of winding "drives" and cul-de-sac that dominates contemporary suburban and exurban design.

As the unincorporated Lakewood grew to a community of more than 70,000 residents, so grew its municipal needs. Lakewood in 1953 had three choices: be annexed to nearby Long Beach, remain unincorporated and continue to receive county services, or incorporate as a city under a novel plan that continued county services under contract. In 1954, residents chose the latter option and voted to incorporate as a city, the largest community in the country ever to do so and the first city in Los Angeles County to incorporate since 1939.

Lakewood is credited as a pioneer among California cities in service provision. Although it is an incorporated city, Lakewood still contracts for most municipal services, with most of these provided by Los Angeles County and, to a lesser extent, by other public agencies and private industry. Lakewood was the first city in the nation to contract for all of its municipal services when it incorporated as a municipality in 1954, making it the nation's first "contract city." Many other Los Angeles suburbs, such as Cerritos, Bellflower, Walnut, and Diamond Bar, have adopted the so-called "Lakewood Plan." About half the cities in Los Angeles County contract for law enforcement from Los Angeles County though the County Sheriff's Department.

Geography

Demographics

2010
At the 2010 census Lakewood had a population of 80,048. The racial makeup of Lakewood was 44,820 (56.0%) White (40.9% Non-Hispanic White), 6,973 (8.7%) African American, 564 (0.7%) Native American, 13,115 (16.4%) Asian (8.1% Filipino, 1.5% Korean, 1.4% Chinese, 1.4% Cambodian, 1.2% Vietnamese, 0.7% Japanese, 0.6% Indian, 0.4% Thai), 744 (0.9%) Pacific Islander, 9,249 (11.6%) from other races, and 4,583 (5.7%) from two or more races. In addition, there were 24,101 (30.1%) Hispanic or Latino residents of any race; 24.1% of Lakewood's population was of Mexican ancestry.

The census reported that 79,939 people (99.9% of the population) lived in households, 109 (0.1%) lived in non-institutionalized group quarters, and no one was institutionalized.

There were 26,543 households, 10,649 (40.1%) had children under the age of 18 living in them, 14,711 (55.4%) were opposite-sex married couples living together, 3,975 (15.0%) had a female householder with no husband present, 1,696 (6.4%) had a male householder with no wife present.  There were 1,262 (4.8%) unmarried opposite-sex partnerships, and 283 (1.1%) same-sex married couples or partnerships. 4,719 households (17.8%) were one person and 1,965 (7.4%) had someone living alone who was 65 or older. The average household size was 3.01.  There were 20,382 families (76.8% of households); the average family size was 3.41.

The age distribution was 19,476 people (24.3%) under the age of 18, 7,593 people (9.5%) aged 18 to 24, 22,117 people (27.6%) aged 25 to 44, 21,776 people (27.2%) aged 45 to 64, and 9,086 people (11.4%) who were 65 or older.  The median age was 37.5 years. For every 100 females, there were 94.3 males.  For every 100 females age 18 and over, there were 90.8 males.

There were 27,470 housing units at an average density of 2,902.0 per square mile, of the occupied units 19,131 (72.1%) were owner-occupied and 7,412 (27.9%) were rented. The homeowner vacancy rate was 1.1%; the rental vacancy rate was 5.7%.  57,591 people (71.9% of the population) lived in owner-occupied housing units and 22,348 people (27.9%) lived in rental housing units.

During 20092013, Lakewood had a median household income of $77,786, with 8.1% of the population living below the federal poverty line.

2000
At the 2000 census there were 79,345 people in 26,853 households, including 20,542 families, in the city. The population density was 8,414.8 inhabitants per square mile (3,248.7/km). The racial makeup of the city was 62.67% White, 7.34% Black or African American, 0.60% Native American, 13.51% Asian, 0.62% Pacific Islander, 10.10% from other races, and 5.17% from two or more races. Hispanic or Latino of any race were 22.78%.

Of the 26,853 households 38.0% had children under the age of 18 living with them, 57.8% were married couples living together, 13.4% had a female householder with no husband present, and 23.5% were non-families. 18.4% of households were one person and 8.2% were one person aged 65 or older. The average household size was 2.95 and the average family size was 3.37.

The age distribution was 27.5% under the age of 18, 8.1% from 18 to 24, 31.1% from 25 to 44, 21.4% from 45 to 64, and 11.9% 65 or older. The median age was 35 years. For every 100 females, there were 93.9 males. For every 100 females age 18 and over, there were 90.1 males.

The median household income was $58,214 and the median family income  was $63,342. Males had a median income of $45,447 versus $35,206 for females. The per capita income for the city was $22,095. About 5.6% of families and 7.4% of the population were below the poverty line, including 9.3% of those under age 18 and 7.1% of those age 65 or over.

Economy
The Lakewood Center shopping mall opened in 1951.

Top employers
According to the City's 2014-2015 Comprehensive Annual Financial Report, the top employers in the city are:

Retailers

Allen Tire Company (1973)

Arts and culture

Lakewood is served by two County Of Los Angeles Public Libraries: the George Nye Jr. Library, and the Angelo M Iacoboni Library (main).

Government
A five-member city council governs Lakewood. The mayor is appointed annually by the council from among its members. The city attorney and city manager are also appointed by the council.

Education
In the early 1990s, a coalition of Lakewood residents formed the Lakewood Unified School District Organizing Committee, which sought to establish a separate Lakewood school district. The organizing committee became the Lakewood Education Foundation, which raises funds to assist classroom teachers.

Lakewood is served by three school districts.

Long Beach Unified School District schools located in Lakewood include:
 Cleveland Elementary School
 Gompers Elementary School
 Holmes Elementary School
 MacArthur Elementary School
 Madison Elementary School
 Riley Elementary School
 Hoover Middle School
 Lakewood High School

Bellflower Unified School District schools located in Lakewood include:
 Craig Williams Elementary School
 Esther Lindstrom Elementary School
 Stephen Foster Elementary School
 Intensive Learning Center
 Mayfair High School

ABC Unified School District schools located in Lakewood include:
 Aloha Elementary School
 Melbourne Elementary School
 Palms Elementary School
 Willow Elementary School
 Artesia High School

Infrastructure
The San Gabriel River Bike Trail is adjacent to Rynerson Park.

Emergency services
Fire protection in Lakewood is provided by the Los Angeles County Fire Department with ambulance transport by Care Ambulance Service.

The Los Angeles County Sheriff's Department operates the Lakewood Station in Lakewood.

The city of Lakewood operates a law enforcement helicopter patrol independent of the Los Angeles County Sheriff's Aero Bureau called Sky Knight. Founded in 1966, it was the first day-and-night helicopter patrol program in the nation (aerial units had previously been used for search and rescue). Sky Knight flies with a civilian pilot and a sheriff's deputy as observer.

See also

Lakewood Center, one of the largest malls in the United States
Los Angeles County Public Library
Los Angeles County Sheriff's Department

References

Further reading
 D. J. Waldie, Holy Land: A Suburban Memoir, W. W. Norton, 2005.

External links

 
1954 establishments in California
Cities in Los Angeles County, California
Incorporated cities and towns in California
Populated places established in 1954
Los Angeles Harbor Region
Gateway Cities